Lawrence station is a train station in Lawrence, Kansas, United States, served by Amtrak's Southwest Chief train. The Lawrence station was built in 1956 by the Atchison, Topeka and Santa Fe Railway to replace the Atchison Topeka Santa Fe Station built in 1883 which was damaged by the 1951 flood. The Mid-Century Modern station has been listed on the National Register of Historic Places.  From 2015 to 2019 it has been, on average, the third-most-frequented Amtrak station in Kansas; however, in 2019 it passed Topeka to reach second place. 

In 2011 the station underwent more than $1.5 million in improvements, including the construction of a new  platform and repairs to the platform canopy, new lighting and improved access for persons with disabilities. A ceremony was held on December 3 to mark the end of the project. The City of Lawrence assumed ownership in 2017, and has been awarded a $1.2 million grant to carry out a complete restoration of the structure. The majority of the restoration is expected to be complete in 2018.  The station was added to the Register of Kansas Historic Places on November 18, 2017, and was listed on the National Register of Historic Places in 2018.

See also
List of Amtrak stations

References

External links

 Lawrence Amtrak Station (USA Rail Guide -- Train Web)
 Depot Redux – Local group to preserve the station
 Lawrence, Kansas Train Cam – A webcam facing the station from across 7th Street

Amtrak stations in Kansas
Atchison, Topeka and Santa Fe Railway stations
Buildings and structures in Lawrence, Kansas
Railway stations in the United States opened in 1956
National Register of Historic Places in Douglas County, Kansas
1956 establishments in Kansas